John Wyllie may refer to:

John Wyllie (footballer), Scottish footballer
John Wyllie (politician) (1835–1870), British politician

See also
John Wiley (disambiguation)
John Wylie (disambiguation)
John Wyly (died 1400), member of the Parliament of England for Marlborough